Dillagi  is a 1999 Indian Hindi drama film co-produced and  directed by Sunny Deol and also starring Sunny Deol alongside his real-life brother Bobby Deol and Urmila Matondkar.

The film is noted for being the first time Sunny Deol directed a film and also the first time he acted alongside his brother Bobby. This pairing was repeated in 23rd March 1931: Shaheed (2002), Apne (2007), Heroes (2008), Yamla Pagla Deewana (2011), Yamla Pagla Deewana 2 (2013), Poster Boys (2017) and Yamla Pagla Deewana: Phir Se (2018). This movie started as "London" in 1997 under the direction of Gurinder Chadha and Karisma Kapoor as heroine. Eventually London was shelved and Sunny Deol replaced Gurinder Chadha as director and Urmila Matondkar replaced Karisma Kapoor as heroine.

Plot

Rajvir and Ranvir are devoted brothers. They along with their family, leave their village in Punjab to move to Mumbai. When their mother passes away, Ranvir takes on the responsibility of looking after his younger brother. After some hardships Ranvir, along with his father, manages to turn everything around and their family becomes really wealthy. But Rajvir, on the other hand, lives recklessly. The first scene of the movie shows Ranvir inaugurating a hotel and they have a party where Rajvir arrives later with his foreign girl-friend. They have a grand-mother who takes care of them along with their father.

Shalini joins the same college as Rajvir and falls for his charm. He tries to woo her as a joke but she falls in love with him. One night, Shalini confesses her love for Rajvir telling him she intends to marry him assuming the same desire on Rajvir's part, but he takes the proposal casually, as a joke. This doesn't annoys Shalini at first as she had fell for him deeply.

She keeps on talking about marriage but one day Rajvir goes berserk and tells her that he does not love her. He even shows up at Shalini's house (enraged because his friends told him they think he has fallen in love with Shalini) disrespecting her parents as well in the process. This crushes Shalini deeply as she realizes she had loved a wrong person. A college rival of Rajvir, that is jealous of Rajvir since he had a crush on Shalini but she fell in love with Rajvir instead, tries to beat up Rajvir with his hired goons. Ranvir learns of it and rushes over to Rajvir's aid. The college student and his goons attack Rajvir on the head with a weapon, but Ranvir arrives and saves Rajvir, and they thrash the goons and Rajvir's college rival.

Prior to all this, Ranvir had caught a glimpse of Shalini at a signal on a road and fell in love with her. After seeing Shalini at a wedding, he discovers her identity. He sent a marriage proposal but she refused it claiming she loves someone else (Rajvir). Ranvir, heartbroken, accepts.

After the aforesaid event, Shalini meets Ranvir again and they both eventually fall in love, and Shalini accepts Ranvir's marriage proposal. Rajvir later realises his love for Shalini and confesses it in front of Ranvir (who is unaware that Rajvir's love interest is Shalini), who encourages him to propose Shalini. By this time, Rajvir and Ranvir had no idea that they are talking about the same woman.

When he shows up and confesses his love, Shalini very politely disapproves. He feels broke and vows to kill that person (unaware it is Ranvir, as he never met his sister-in-law). Later, he sees Ranvir along with Shalini in a restaurant and in anger behaved very rudely with Ranvir. Ranvir slaps Rajvir and Rajvir pushes him away, leaving both Ranvir and Shalini shocked. Rajvir then runs and attempts to commit suicide by jumping off a bridge, Ranvir rushes behind him, to save him, but is hit by a car and goes into a coma. Shalini bursts out at Rajvir because, due to him, so many people were troubled.

Later, in an emotional scene, Rajvir apologises to Ranvir, and he wakes up from his coma forgiving Rajvir. Shalini and Ranvir get married.

The film ends up with Rajvir going back to his village and ends up meeting Rani and falling for her. Rani is played by the beautiful Preity Zinta.

Cast 
 Sunny Deol as Ranvir Singh
 Bobby Deol as Rajvir Singh / Rocky
 Urmila Matondkar as Shalini
 Dara Singh as Veer Singh (Ranvir's and Rajvir's father)
 Zohra Sehgal as Ranvir and Rajvir's grandmother
 Preity Zinta as Rani (special appearance)
 Sushmita Mukherjee
 Raj Zutshi as Nikhil
 Parvin Dabas as Sameer
 Raj Kumar Kapoor
 Tora Khasgir 
 Dimple Inamdar
 Pervinder Gujral
 Goldie Choundhary
 Shefali Ganguly
 Kanika Shivpuri
 Rajshri Solanki
 Alistair Woodham
 Raspal Virdee
 Colonel Kapoor
 Narinder Kaur
 Deepshikha
 Kulbhushan Kharbanda as Shalini's father
 Reema Lagoo as Shalini's mother
 Jasbir Thandi as Vikram

Music
Dillagi features music composed by a number of directors, including Jatin–Lalit, Shankar–Ehsaan–Loy, Anand–Milind, and Sukhwinder Singh. The music got a positive review with a huge compilation of singers including Mahendra Kapoor, Kumar Sanu, Amit Kumar, Abhijeet, Udit Narayan, Sonu Nigam, KK Roop Kumar Rathod, Sukhwinder Singh, Shankar Mahadevan, Shaan, Kavita Krishnamurthy, Alka Yagnik, Jaspinder Narula, Mahalaxmi Iyer, Mohini Brahmbhatt and Nusrat Fateh Ali Khan. The Title song Dillagi assembles ten finest singers to render their voice together but was not picturised accordingly like Title song of Mela and Apna Bombay Talkies.

References

External links

1990s Hindi-language films
1999 films
Films scored by Jatin–Lalit
Films scored by Anand–Milind
Films scored by Shankar–Ehsaan–Loy
Films scored by Sukhwinder Singh
Vijayta Films films
1999 directorial debut films